Andreia de Jesus Jacinto (born 8 June 2002) is a Portuguese professional footballer who plays as a midfielder for Real Sociedad and the Portugal national team.

Club career
Jacinto first joined Sporting CP in 2016 and signed her first professional contract with the club on 25 September 2019, at the age of 17.

International career
Jacinto made her debut for the Portugal national team on 7 March 2020 against Belgium in the 2020 Algarve Cup.

References

2002 births
Living people
Women's association football midfielders
Portuguese women's footballers
Portugal women's international footballers
Sportspeople from Cascais
Sporting CP (women's football) players
Campeonato Nacional de Futebol Feminino players